The Steel Dragon is a steel roller coaster that is located at Waldameer Park in Erie, Pennsylvania, United States. It is a spinning roller coaster. It was manufactured by Maurer Söhne and opened in July 2004.

History

The Steel Dragon opened to the public in 2004. It has been in continuous operation since opening.

Features

The ride is a steel Maurer AG. The car of 4 takes a right turn out of the station followed by a lift hill. The ride then completes the largest drop upon proceeding above the station. The ride then hits a 90-degree bank. The ride completes one more rectangular circuit upon finishing.

Trains
The Steel Dragon has eight cars. The riders sit two in a row back to back in a car. Four riders can fit in a car at once. Waldameer Park typically runs a four-to-six car operation.

References

Roller coasters introduced in 2004
2004 establishments in Pennsylvania
Roller coasters in Pennsylvania